Jean-Louis Cuchot d'Herbain (Chevalier d'Herbain; 10 April 1720 – 28 May 1768) was an 18th-century French baroque composer with a professional career in the military.

Short biography
Born in Strasbourg, d'Herbain was destined to a military career, and became a captain in the regiment of Tournaisis. While he was stationed in Italy, he began to compose operas: Il geloso (Rome, 1751), Il trionfo del Giglio (Bastia, 1751) and La Lavinia (Bastia, 1753).

Back in Paris, he composed the music for the ballet Célime (1756) and the opéras comiques Les Deux talents (1763, on a libretto by Jean-François de Bastide) and Nanette et Lucas (1764, on a libretto by Nicolas-Étienne Framery). Some of his vocal works, including many ariettes, enjoyed lasting success.

He died in Paris aged 48.

Works
1751: Il geloso, intermezzo
1751: Il trionfo del Giglio / Le Triomphe du lys, opera
1753: La Lavinia, opera
1756: Iphis et Célime, ou Le Temple de l'indifférence détruit pas l'amour,  opera-ballet
1763: Les Deux talents, opéra comique
1764: Nanette et Lucas, ou La Paysanne curieuse, comedy, prose with ariettes

References

External links
 His works and presentations on CÉSAR
 Operone - Chevalier d'Herbain

1720 births
1768 deaths
18th-century classical composers
18th-century French composers
French ballet composers
French Baroque composers
French opera composers
Male opera composers
Musicians from Paris
17th-century male musicians